Macauã River is a river of Acre state in western Brazil, a tributary of the Iaco River.

The river forms most of the southeast boundary of the  Macauã National Forest, a sustainable use conservation unit created in 1988.
It flows through the northern part of the  São Francisco National Forest, a sustainable use conservation unit created in 2001.
It then flows through the eastern part of the  Cazumbá-Iracema Extractive Reserve, established in 2002 to support sustainable use of the natural resources by the traditional population.

See also
List of rivers of Acre

References

Rivers of Acre (state)